The following outline is provided as an overview of and topical guide to Palermo:

Palermo – city of Southern Italy, the capital of both the autonomous region of Sicily and the Metropolitan City of Palermo. The city is noted for its history, culture, architecture and gastronomy, playing an important role throughout much of its existence; it is over 2,700 years old. Palermo is located in the northwest of the island of Sicily, right by the Gulf of Palermo in the Tyrrhenian Sea. The city was founded in 734 BC by the Phoenicians. Palermo then became a possession of Carthage, before becoming part of the Roman Republic, the Roman Empire and eventually part of the Byzantine Empire, for over a thousand years. From 831 to 1072 the city was under Arab rule during the Emirate of Sicily when the city first became a capital. Following the Norman reconquest, Palermo became the capital of a new kingdom (from 1130 to 1816), the Kingdom of Sicily and the capital of the Holy Roman Empire under Emperor Frederick II and King Conrad IV. Palermo is Sicily's cultural, economic and tourism capital. It is a city rich in history, culture, art, music and food. Numerous tourists are attracted to the city for its good Mediterranean weather, its renowned gastronomy and restaurants, its Romanesque, Gothic and Baroque churches, palaces and buildings, and its nightlife and music. Palermo is the main Sicilian industrial and commercial center: the main industrial sectors include tourism, services, commerce and agriculture.

General reference 
 Common English name(s): Palermo
 Official English name(s): City of Palermo
 Adjectival(s): Palermitan
 Demonym(s): Palermitan

Geography of Palermo 

Geography of Palermo
 Palermo is:
 a city
 capital of Sicily
 capital of Metropolitan City of Palermo
 Population of Palermo:
 City: 676,118
 Metro: 1,300,000
 Area of Palermo:  158.9 km2 (61.4 sq mi)
 Atlas of Palermo

Location of Palermo 

 Palermo is situated within the following regions:
 Northern Hemisphere and Eastern Hemisphere
 Eurasia
 Europe (outline)
 Western Europe
 Southern Europe
 Italian Peninsula
 Italy (outline)
 Southern Italy
 Sicily
 Metropolitan City of Palermo
 Time zone(s): Central European Time (UTC+01), Central European Summer Time (UTC+02)

Environment of Palermo 

 Climate of Palermo

Natural geographic features of Palermo 

 Hills in Palermo
 Mount Pellegrino
 Rivers in Palermo
Oreto River
 World Heritage Sites in Palermo
 Cappella Palatina
 Church of San Cataldo
 Martorana
 Palazzo dei Normanni
 Palermo Cathedral
 Ponte dell'Ammiraglio
 San Giovanni degli Eremiti
 Zisa

Areas of Palermo

Districts of Palermo 
 Districts of Palermo

Neighborhoods in Palermo 

 Brancaccio
 Ciaculli
 Guadagna
 Kalsa
 ZEN (Palermo)

Locations in Palermo 

 Tourist attractions
 Museums in Palermo
 Shopping areas and markets

Ancient monuments in Palermo 
 Catacombe dei Cappuccini
 Rosalia Lombardo
 City walls

Bridges in Palermo 
 Ponte dell'Ammiraglio

Castles in Palermo 
 Castello a Mare
 Castello di Maredolce
 Zisa

Churches in Palermo 

Churches in Palermo
 Church of San Cataldo
 Church of the Gesù
 Church of the Holy Spirit
 La Magione
 Oratorio del Rosario di San Domenico
 Oratory of Saint Lawrence
 Palermo Cathedral
 San Domenico
 San Francesco d'Assisi
 San Francesco Saverio
 San Giorgio dei Genovesi
 San Giovanni degli Eremiti
 San Giuseppe dei Teatini
 Sant'Agostino
 Santa Maria della Pietà, Palermo
 Santa Maria dello Spasimo
 Santissimo Salvatore

City Gates of Palermo 
 Porta Felice
 Porta Nuova

Fountains in Palermo 

 Fontana del Garraffo
 Fontana del Genio a Villa Giulia
 Fontana Pretoria

Museums and galleries in Palermo 
 Modern Art Gallery Sant'Anna
 Palazzo Riso
 Regional Archeological Museum Antonio Salinas
 Palermo Fragment
 Palermo Stone

Palaces and villas in Palermo 

 Cuba Palace
 Palazzina Cinese
 Palazzo Abatellis
 The Triumph of Death
 Palazzo Ajutamicristo
 Palazzo Chiaramonte
 Palazzo Comitini
 Palazzo Isnello
 Apotheosis of Palermo
 Palazzo dei Normanni
 Cappella Palatina
 Palermo Astronomical Observatory
 Palazzo Natoli
 Palazzo Pretorio
 Palazzo Sclafani
 Palazzo Valguarnera-Gangi
 Villa Malfitano Whitaker

Parks and gardens in Palermo 

 Orto botanico di Palermo
 Parco della Favorita
 Villa Giulia

Public squares in Palermo 
 Piazza Bellini
 Piazza Castelnuovo
 Piazza della Vittoria
 Piazza Marina
 Piazza Pretoria
 Quattro Canti
 Piazza Ruggero Settimo
 Piazza San Domenico
 Piazza Verdi

Streets and walking paths in Palermo 

 Cassaro
 Foro Italico
 Via Maqueda
 Via Roma

Theatres in Palermo 

 Teatro Biondo
 Teatro Massimo
 Teatro Politeama

Demographics of Palermo 

Demographics of Palermo

Government and politics of Palermo 
Government and politics of Palermo
 Government of Palermo
 List of mayors of Palermo

Law and order in Palermo

History of Palermo 
History of Palermo

History of Palermo, by period
Timeline of Palermo

 Early history
 Middle Ages
 Two Sicilies
 Italian unification and today

History of Palermo, by subject 
 Battle of Palermo

Culture of Palermo 

Culture of Palermo

Arts in Palermo

Architecture in Palermo 

Neoclassical architecture in Palermo

 Entrance to the Palermo Botanical Garden
 Accademia di Belle Arti di Palermo

Music of Palermo 

 Opera houses
 Teatro Massimo

Visual arts of Palermo 

 Cuisine of Palermo
 Cassata

Religion in Palermo 
 Christianity in Palermo
 Bishop of Palermo
 Diocese of Palermo
 Catholicism in Palermo
 Roman Catholic Archdiocese of Palermo

Sports in Palermo 

Sports in Palermo

 Sports venues in Palermo
 Diamante Fondo Patti
 Stadio Renzo Barbera
 Velodromo Paolo Borsellino

Economy and infrastructure of Palermo 
Economy of Palermo

Banking in Palermo
 Banca Nuova

Transportation in Palermo 

Transportation in Palermo

Airports in Palermo
 Falcone–Borsellino Airport
 Palermo–Boccadifalco Airport

Bus transport in Palermo

Ports in Palermo
 Port of Palermo

Rail transport in palermo 

 Commuter rail
 Palermo metropolitan railway stations
 Palermo Centrale railway station
 Palermo Notarbartolo railway station
 Punta Raisi railway station

Trams in Palermo

Vehicular traffic system in Palermo
 Roads in Palermo

Education in Palermo 

Education in Palermo
 Public education in Palermo
 Universities in Palermo
 University of Palermo

See also 

 Outline of geography

References

External links 

Palermo
Palermo
 1